Cassiques (junior) and landgraves (senior) were intended to be a fresh new system of titles of specifically American lesser nobility, created for hereditary representatives in a proposed upper house of a bicameral Carolina assembly.

Carolina Assembly
They were proposed in the late 17th century and set out in the Fundamental Constitutions of Carolina.  The Fundamental Constitutions were never ratified by the assembly, and were largely abandoned by 1700.

The upper house, consisting of the Landgraves and Casiques..are..a middle state between Lords and Commons. (1702)  They are there by Patent, under the Great Seal of the Provinces, call'd Landgraves and Cassocks, in lieu of Earls and Lords. (1707)

Cacique, a native chief or ‘prince’ of the aborigines in the West Indies and adjacent parts of America. (1555)

Native American leaders
The title Cassique was bestowed upon the Chief (Chieftain) or leader of the Native American tribes (mainly the Kiawah Indians) which originally settled the low-country of South Carolina, near modern day Charleston, South Carolina. The Kiawah Indians referred to the area where the peninsula of the city of Charleston, SC located between the modern day Ashley River (then known as the Kiawah River) and the Cooper River (called the Wando River) as "Chicora". The Cassique of Kiawah, who had traded with the Cape Fear Barbadian colony and sent his nephew as an emissary to England with explorer Captain Robert Sandford in 1666, was a friend to the English and urged the English to settle the area known as "Chicora". The Cassique's motivating factors were both financial and the Intrinsic motivation of Tranquility as the Kiawah Indians would gain an established trading partner with the English as well as protection from the Spanish in Florida and the neighboring Westoe tribe who were known cannibals and had attacked the Kiawah Indians on several occasions. 

The Cassique and his Kiawah tribes were quite persuasive and the English established the settlement Charles Towne, named for the Lord Proprietors' benefactor King Charles II of England, on the West bank of the Ashley (Kiawah) River at Albemarle Point in 1670. Thus, the Kiawah Indians became comrades with the English as perhaps was predetermined when the Kiawah originally greeted the colonists upon arrival at Bull's Bay with the phrase "Bony Conraro Angles!" (meaning "Good English Comrades") in poorly spoken Spanish.

Identified landgraves, landgravines and cassiques

This is a list of identified South Carolina landgraves, landgravines (female version) and cassiques (female term unknown). Their "baronies" often had Native American names. Seemingly, only about half of this colonial South Carolina nobility ever reached its soil. One man was both Cassique and Landgrave. In some cases, the title seems to have been inherited.

Gov. John Archdale, Landgrave, Created 1694
Christopher Arthur, Esq., Landgrave/Cassique? (Created c1724, of "Cypress" Barony)
John Ashby, Esq., Cassique, "Quenby" (aka "Yadhaw"), Created 1682
John Ashby, Jr., Esq., Cassique?, Inherited? after 1699
John Ashby, III, Esq., Cassique?, Inherited? c1716 (d1729)
Hon. Daniel Axtell, Sr., Landgrave, Created 1681
Hon. Holland Axtell, Landgrave, Created 1692
Lady Rebecca Pratt Axtel, Landgravine? (Of "Newington" Barony)
John Bailey, Esq., Landgrave, Created 1682 (Of "Otter Island" Barony)
John Bayley, Esq., Landgrave/Cassique? (16,200a "Hilton Head Island" Barony?)
Sir Edmund Bellinger, Sr., Landgrave, Created 1698 (Of "Tombodly" & "Ashepoo" Baronies)
Edmund Bellinger, Jr., Esq., Landgrave, Inherited c1705
Sir Edmund Bellinger, III, Landgrave, Inherited c1739
Edmund Bellinger, IV, Esq., Landgrave, Inherited? c1772
Edmund Cussings Bellinger, Esq., (1813–1848) Inherited?, Landgrave?, of "Poca Sabo" Barony?
Joseph Bellinger, Esq., Landgrave, Inherited? c1773, of "Aeolian Lawn" Barony?
Thomas Bellinger, Esq., Landgrave, Inherited
Col. Edward Berkerley (Fictional), Cassique, "Created" c1684 (Of [Fictional] "Kiawah" Barony)
Gov. Daniel Blake, Landgrave?, Inherited c1751
Gov. & Gen. Joseph Blake, Sr., Landgrave, Created 1696 ("Plainfield" Barony)
Col. Joseph Blake, Jr., Landgrave, Inherited c1700
Capt. James Carteret R.N., Landgrave, Created 1670
John Carteret, Jr., Earl Granville, Landgrave?, Inherited? c1718, of "Hobcaw" Barony)
Hon. John (Carteret?), Landgrave, Created c1718 (of "Hobcaw" Barony)
Gov. James Colleton, Landgrave, Created 1670/71 (Of "Fairlawn" Barony), "Wadboo" Barony?, Devil's Elbow Barony?
Hon. Peter Colleton, Landgrave, of "Fairlawn" Barony
Hon. Thomas Colleton, Sr., Landgrave, Created 1681 (Of "Cypres" Barony)
Sir William Craven, Sr., Landgrave & Cassique
Lawrence Crump, Esq., Landgrave?
Deputy Gov. Robert Daniell, Landgrave, Created c1711 (Of "Winyah" Barony)
Dr. Christopher Dominick, Cassique
Gov. Charles Eden, Langrave, Created 1718 and last Landgrave created
John Ely, Esq., Landgrave?
John Ffoster, Esq., Cassiqie, Created c1677/78
John Gibbs, Esq., Cassique, Created 1682
Hon. James Griffths, Landgrave, Created 1707 (Of "Port Royal" Barony)
Hon. ???? Griffiths, Landgrave, Inherited After 1707 (Father of James Griffiths)
Hon. William Hodgson, Landgrave & Cassique, Created c1714-1717?
Col. Samuel Horsey/Horseley, Landgrave
Lady Mary Ketelby Johnston, Landgravine?, Inherited
Gov. Robert Johnston, Landgrave?
Gov. Sir Nathaniel Johnson, Landgrave & Cassique, Created 1686, of "Silk Hope" Barony
Edward Jewkes, Esq., Landgrave
Hon. Abel Ketelby, Sr., Landgrave, Created 1708/09
Gov. Sir Richard Kyrle, Landgrave, Created 1684
Hon. John Locke, Landgrave, Created 1671
Thomas Lowndes?, Esq., Landgrave or Cassique?, c1728
Gov. Philip Ludwell, Cassique
John Monke, Esq., Cassique, Created 1682/83
Gov. James Moore, Sr.?, Landgrave, of "Yeshoe" Barony, "Boo-craw-ee" Barony, "Wapensaw" Barony
Gov. Joseph Morre, Landgrave
Hon. Joseph Morton, I, Landgrave, Created 1681
Hon. Joseph Morton, II, Landgrave
Joseph Pendarvis, Esq., Landgrave? (Often incorrectly designated Landgrave)
Col. Andrew Percival, Landgrave?, Created c1677
Spencer Percival, Esq., Landgrave?
Gov. John Price, Landgrave
Maj. Thomas Rowe, Cassique, Created 1682
Lady Statira Elizabeth Farquarson Johnston Rundell, Landgravine? (Inherited?)
Henry Smith, Esq., Landgrave, Inherited
John Smith, Esq., Cassique, Created 1682 ("Boo-shoo" Barony)
Col. Joseph Smith, Landgrave, Inherited ("Wiskinboo" Barony)
Gov. Thomas Smith, Jr., Cassique, Created 1691, Landgrave, Created 1693 (Smith's barony may have included Smith's/Bald Head Island, N.C.)
Hon. Thomas Smith, III, Landgrave, Created 1689, of "Whiskinboo" Barony
Gov. Seth Sothell/Southwell, Landgrave (title "Suspended")
Hon. Joseph West, Landgrave, Created 1684
Capt. Henry Wilkinson, Cassique, Created 1681
Edward Willimot, Esq., Landgrave (title "Suspended")
Lady Elizabeth Bellinger Wright, Landgravine?, Inherited
Sir John Wyche, Landgrave, Created Prior to 1701, "Poco Sabo" Barony
Gov. Sir John Yeamans, Baronet, Landgrave, Created 1671

Notes

References

Further reading
The Avalon Project of Yale Law School provides source documents for this period of the Carolina Colony history.
The Fundamental Constitutions of Carolina
The Landgraves, Cassiques, and Baronies of Carolina
Heirs of Hereditary Landgraves & Cassiques

External links
  The Lords Proprietors' Grant and Seal, John Wyche, Landgrave 1699 held at The University of South Carolina, University Libraries

Pre-statehood history of South Carolina
Titles of nobility in the Americas